The 2005 Grand Prix de Tennis de Lyon was a men's tennis tournament played on indoor hard courts. It was played at the Palais des Sports de Gerland in Lyon, France, and was part of the 2005 ATP Tour. It was the 19th edition of the tournament and took place from 24 October through 31 October 2005. First-seeded Andy Roddick won the singles title.

Finals

Singles

 Andy Roddick defeated  Gaël Monfils 6–3, 6–2
 It was Roddick's 5th singles title of the year and the 20th of his career.

Doubles

 Michaël Llodra /  Fabrice Santoro defeated  Jeff Coetzee /  Rogier Wassen 6–3, 6–1
 It was Llodra's 3rd title of the year and the 9th of his career. It was Santoro's 3rd title of the year and the 21st of his career.

References

External links
 ITF tournament edition details

 
Grand Prix de Tennis de Lyon
Grand Prix de Tennis de Lyon